Min-chul, also spelled Min-chol, is a Korean masculine given name. Its meaning differs based on the hanja used to write each syllable of the name. There are 27 hanja with the reading "min" and 11 hanja with the reading "chul" on the South Korean government's official list of hanja which may be used in given names.

People with this name include:
Kang Min-chol (born 1948), North Korean politician
Jung Min-cheul (born 1972), South Korean baseball pitcher
Kang Minchul (born 1973), South Korean yongmudo practitioner
Park Min-chul (born 1974), South Korean handball player
Choi Min-chul (born 1976), South Korean actor
Back Min-chul (born 1977), South Korean football goalkeeper
Kim Min-chul (born 1983), South Korean Greco-Roman wrestler
Son Min-chol (born 1986), North Korean football centre back (Japan Football League)
Jang Min-chul (born 1991), South Korean professional StarCraft player
An Min-chol, North Korean politician
Kang Min-chul (c.1955 – 18 May 2008), North Korean soldier and one of the three perpetrators of the 1983 Rangoon bombing. He was sentenced to life imprisonment by a court in Burma and died in prison while serving his sentence

See also
List of Korean given names

References

Korean masculine given names